The men's 3000 metres steeplechase at the 2015 Southeast Asian Games was held in National Stadium, Singapore. The track and field events took place on June 12.

Schedule
All times are (UTC+08:00)

Records

Results 
Legend
PB — Personal Best

References

Athletics at the 2015 Southeast Asian Games